Ariane 6 is a European expendable launch system currently under development since the early 2010s by ArianeGroup on behalf of the European Space Agency (ESA). It is intended to replace the Ariane 5, as part of the Ariane launch vehicle family. The stated motivation for Ariane 6 (as of 2015) was to halve the cost compared to Ariane 5, and increase the capacity for the number of launches per year (from six or seven to up to eleven).

Ariane 6 is designed with two core stages both powered by liquid hydrogen-liquid oxygen (hydrolox) engines. The first stage has an improved version of the Vulcain engine already used on the Ariane 5, whilst the second stage has a newly designed Vinci engine. Most of the initial lift-off thrust is provided by solid rocket boosters attached to the first stage: either two or four P120s (Ariane 62 and Ariane 64 variants respectively), which are larger versions of the P80s used on the Vega rocket.

Selection of the design concept was made by ESA in December 2014, favouring it over an alternative all-solid-fuel rocket option. Further high-level design was completed in 2015 and the vehicle entered the detailed design phase in 2016. In 2017, the European Space Agency (ESA) set 16 July 2020 as the deadline for the first flight, and in May 2019 Arianespace placed the first production order. Following several delays,  Arianespace expects the first launch to occur in the fourth quarter of 2023.

Description 
Two variants of Ariane 6 are being developed:
It can launch up to  into GTO and  into LEO.
Like Ariane 5, it will be able to launch two geosynchronous satellites together.

Ariane 6 comprises three major structural and propellant-carrying components.

Lower Liquid Propulsion Module 
The first stage of Ariane 6 is called the Lower Liquid Propulsion Module (LLPM). It is powered by a single Vulcain 2.1 engine, burning liquid hydrogen (LH2) with liquid oxygen (LOX). Vulcain 2.1 is an updated version of the Vulcain 2 engine from Ariane 5 with lower manufacturing costs.

Solid Rockets 
Additional thrust for the first stage will be provided by either two or four P120 Solid rocket boosters, known within Ariane 6 nomenclature as Equipped Solid Rockets (ESR). The P120 motor is also first stage of the upgraded Vega C smallsat launcher. The increased production volumes through sharing motors lowers production costs.

The first full-scale test of the ESR occurred at Kourou on 16 July 2018, and the test completed successfully with the thrust reaching  in vacuum.

Upper Liquid Propulsion Module 
The upper stage of Ariane 6 is called the Upper Liquid Propulsion Module (ULPM). It features the same  diameter as the LLPM, and also burns liquid hydrogen with oxygen. It is powered by the Vinci engine delivering  of thrust and enabling multiple restarts.

History 
Ariane 6 was initially conceived in the early 2010s to be a replacement launch vehicle for Ariane 5, and a number of concepts and high-level designs were suggested and proposed during 2012–2015. Development funding from several European governments was initially secured by early 2016, and contracts were signed to begin detailed design and the build of test articles. While in 2019, the maiden orbital flight had been planned for 2020, by May 2020, the planned initial launch date had been delayed into 2021. In October 2020, ESA formally requested an additional  in funding from the countries sponsoring the project to complete development of the rocket and get the vehicle to its first test flight, which had slipped to the second quarter of 2022. By June 2021, the date had delayed to late 2022. In June 2022, a delay was announced to "some time in 2023" and by October 2022, ESA clarified that the first launch would be no earlier than the fourth quarter of 2023, while providing no public reason for the delay.

Concept and early development: 2010–2015 

Following detailed definition studies in 2012, the European Space Agency (ESA) announced the selection of the "PPH" (first stage of three P145 rocket motors, second stage of one P145 rocket motor, and H32 cryogenic upper stage) configuration for the Ariane 6 in July 2013. Development was projected to cost €4 billion . A 2014 study concluded that development cost could be reduced to about 3 billion euros by limiting contractors to five countries.

While the Ariane 5 typically launches one large and one medium satellite at a time, the PPH proposal for the Ariane 6 was intended for single payloads, with an early 2014 price estimate of approximately US$95 million per launch. The SpaceX Falcon 9 and the Chinese Long March 3B both launch smaller payloads but at lower prices, approximately US$57 million and US$72 million respectively as of early 2014, making the Falcon 9 launch of a midsize satellite competitive with the cost of the lower slot of a dual payload Ariane 5. For lightweight all-electric satellites, Arianespace intended to use the restartable Vinci engine to deliver the satellites closer to their operational orbit than the Falcon 9 could, thus reducing the time required to transfer to geostationary orbit by several months.

Ariane 6.1 and Ariane 6.2 proposals 
In June 2014, Airbus and Safran surprised ESA by announcing a counter proposal for the Ariane 6 project: a 50/50 joint venture to develop the rocket, which would also involve buying out the French government's CNES interest in Arianespace.

This proposed launch system would come in two variants, Ariane 6.1 and Ariane 6.2. Ariane 6.1 would have the ability to launch two electrically powered satellites at once, while Ariane 6.2 would be focused on launching government payloads.

French newspaper La Tribune questioned whether Airbus Space Systems could deliver on the promised costs for their Ariane 6 proposal, and whether Airbus and Safran Group could be trusted when they were found to be responsible for a failure of Ariane 5 flight 517 in 2002 and a more recent 2013 failure of the M51 ballistic missile. During the meeting of EU ministers in Geneva on 7 June 2014, these prices were deemed too high and no agreement with manufacturers was reached.

Ariane 62 and Ariane 64 proposals 

Following criticism of the Ariane 6 PPH design, France unveiled a revised Ariane 6 proposal in September 2014. This launcher would use a cryogenic main stage powered by the Vulcain 2 and upper stage powered by the Vinci, but vary the number of solid boosters. With four boosters, Ariane 6 would be able to launch two satellites totaling  to GTO at a cost of €90 million.

This proposal, unlike Ariane 6 PPH, offered a scalable launcher while retaining Ariane 5's dual-launch capability. The proposal also included simplification of the industrial and institutional organisation along with a better and cheaper version of the Vulcain 2 engine for the main stage. Although Ariane 6 was projected to have "lower estimated recurring production costs", it was projected to have "a higher overall development cost owing to the need for a new, Ariane 6-dedicated, launch pad".

The Italian, French and German space ministers met on 23 September 2014, in order to plan strategy and assess the possibility for agreement on funding for the Ariane 5 successor, and in December 2014, ESA selected the Ariane 62 and Ariane 64 designs for development and funding.

At the 2022 International Astronautical Congress ArianeGroup announced the proposed "Smart Upper Stage for Innovative Exploration", a reusable upper stage for the 64 (or later) variant, capable of autonomous cargo operations or carrying five astronauts to low Earth orbit.

Test vehicle development: 2016–2021 
The basic design was finalised in January 2016, advancing the development into detailed design and production phases, with the first major contracts already signed. Unlike previous Ariane rockets which are assembled and fueled vertically before being transported to the launchpad, the Ariane 6 main stages were to be assembled horizontally at the new integration hall in Les Mureaux and then transported to French Guiana, to be erected and integrated with boosters and payload.

The horizontal assembly process was inspired by the Russian tradition for Soyuz and Proton launcherswhich had more recently been applied to the American Delta IV and Falcon 9 boosterswith a stated goal of halving production costs.

The industrial production process was completely overhauled, allowing synchronized workflow between several European production sites moving at a monthly cadence, which would enable twelve launches per year, doubling Ariane 5's yearly capacity. To further lower the price, Ariane 6 engines were to use 3D printed components. Ariane 6 was to be the first large rocket to use a laser ignition system developed by Austria's Carinthian Research Center (CTR), that was previously deployed in automotive and turbine engines. A solid state laser offers an advantage over electrical ignition systems in that it is more flexible with regards to the location of the plasma within the combustion chamber, offers a much higher pulse power and can tolerate a wider range of fuel-air mixture ratios.

Reorganisation of the industry behind a new launch vehicle, leading to a creation of Airbus Safran Launchers, also started a review by the French government, into tax matters, and the European Commission over a possible conflict of interest if Airbus Defence and Space, a satellite manufacturer were to purchase launches from ASL.

While development was initially slated to be substantially complete in 2019, with an initial launch in 2020, the initial launch date has slipped several times: first to 2021 then to 2022 and 2023. As of October 2022, Arianespace expects the maiden flight to occur in 2023.

Other development options 

CNES began studies in 2010 on an alternative, reusable first stage for Ariane 6, using a mix of liquid oxygen and liquid methane rather than liquid hydrogen that is used in the 2016 Ariane 6 first-stage design. The methane-powered core could use one or more engines, matching capabilities of Ariane 64 with only two boosters instead of four. , the economic feasibility of reusing an entire stage remained in question. Concurrent with the liquid fly-back booster research in the late 1990s and early 2000s, CNES along with Russia concluded studies indicating that reusing the first stage was economically unviable as manufacturing ten rockets a year was cheaper and more feasible than recovery, refurbishment and loss of performance caused by reusability. It was suggested that with Arianespace launch schedule of 12 flights per year that an engine that could be reused a dozen times would produce a demand for only one engine per year making supporting an ongoing engine manufacturing supply chain unviable.

In June 2015, Airbus Defence and Space announced that development of Adeline, a partially reusable first stage, would become operational between 2025 and 2030, and that it would be developed as a subsequent first stage for Ariane 6. Rather than developing a way to reuse an entire first stage (like SpaceX), Airbus proposed a system where only high-value parts would be safely returned using a winged module at the bottom of the rocket stack.

In August 2016, Airbus Safran Launchers gave some more details about future development plans building on the Ariane 6 design. CEO Alain Charmeau revealed that Airbus Safran were now working along two main lines: first, continuing work (at the company's own expense) on the recoverable Adeline engine-and-avionics module; and second, beginning development of a next-generation engine to be called Prometheus. This engine would have about the same thrust as the Vulcain 2 currently powering Ariane 5, but would burn methane instead of liquid hydrogen. Charmeau was non-committal about whether Prometheus (still only in the first few months of development) could be used as an expendable replacement for the Vulcain 2 in Ariane 6, or whether it was tied to the re-usable Adeline design, saying only that "We are cautious, and we prefer to speak when are sure of what we announce... But certainly this engine could very well fit with the first stage of Ariane 6 one day", a decision on whether to proceed with Prometheus in an expendable or reusable role could be taken between 2025 and 2030.

In 2017, the Prometheus engine project was revealed to have the aim of reducing the engine unit cost from the €10 million of the Vulcain2 to €1 million and allowing the engine to be reused up to five times. The engine development is said to being part of a broader effort – codename Ariane NEXT – to reduce Ariane launch costs by a factor of 2 beyond improvements brought by Ariane 6. The Ariane NEXT initiative includes a reusable sounding rocket, Callisto, to test the performance of various fuels in new engine designs.

Production 
In a January 2019 interview, Arianespace CEO Stéphane Israël said that the company requires four more institutional launches for Ariane 6 to sign a manufacturing contract. Launch contracts are needed for the transitional period of 2020–2023 when the Ariane 5 will be phased out and gradually replaced by the Ariane 6. The company requires European institutions to become an anchor customer for the launcher. In response, ESA representatives said the agency was working on shifting the 2022 launch of the Jupiter Icy Moons Explorer from the Ariane 5 ECA to the Ariane 64, further indicating that there are other institutional customers in Europe that must put their weight behind the project, such as the European Organisation for the Exploitation of Meteorological Satellites (EUMETSAT) or the European Commission.

, Arianespace had sold three flights of the Ariane 6 launch vehicle.
One month later, they added a satellite internet constellation launch contract with OneWeb to utilize the maiden launch of Ariane 6 to help populate the large 600-satellite constellation.

On 6 May 2019, Arianespace ordered the first production batch of 14 Ariane 6 rockets, for missions to be conducted between 2021 and 2023.

Development funding 
Ariane 6 is being developed in a public-private partnership with the majority of the funding coming from various ESA government sources —  — while  is reported to be "industry's share".

The ESA Council approved the project on 3 November 2016, and the ESA Industrial Policy Committee released the required funds on 8 November 2016.

In January 2020, the European Investment Bank, in partnership with the EC, made a €100 million loan to Arianespace drawing from the Horizon 2020 and Investment Plan for Europe corporate investment programmes. The 10-year loan's repayment is tied to the financial success of the Ariane 6 project.

Launch contracts and scheduled flights 

The first Ariane 6 launch contract was signed on 25 June 2015: an option for three launches for the OneWeb satellite constellation.In the event, the OneWeb launch contracts were modified following the bankruptcy of OneWeb in 2020. Future ESA Galileo satellite launches are booked on Ariane 6. On 11 September 2018, Arianespace announced a firm order by Eutelsat for five commercial communication satellites over several years, and the French CNES converted one of their three contracted launches for spy satellites from a Soyuz to an Ariane 6.

References

External links 

 Ariane 6 concept video, Airbus Safran Launchers, November 2016.
 Airbus Defence and Space presents Ariane 6 at Paris Air Show 2015

Ariane (rocket family)